John Weiss Forney (30 September 1817 – 9 December 1881) was an American newspaper publisher and politician. He was clerk of the United States House of Representatives from 1851 through 1856, and again from 1860 through 1861. He was thereafter secretary of the United States Senate from 1861 through 1868.

Biography
He was born at Lancaster, Pennsylvania and at the age of 16 entered the printing office of the Lancaster Journal.  Four years later he purchased the Lancaster Intelligencer, and in 1840 he became proprietor of the Journal and combined the two papers under the name of the Intelligencer and Journal.  In 1845 President James K. Polk appointed him deputy surveyor of the port of Philadelphia, and he disposed of the Intelligencer and Journal, and purchased a half interest in the Pennsylvanian, a Democratic paper of great influence, which under his editorial control attained a national importance.

From 1851 to 1855 he was Clerk of the United States House of Representatives, and, while continuing to write for the Pennsylvanian, he edited the Union, the organ of the Northern Democrats.  While Clerk, it became Forney's duty to preside during a protracted struggle for the speakership in 1855, which resulted in the election of Nathaniel P. Banks. His tact as presiding officer won the applause of all parties.

In 1855 he headed the Pennsylvania delegation to the Democratic National Convention at Cincinnati, and was instrumental in securing the nomination of Pennsylvania's candidate, James Buchanan. He conducted Buchanan's successful campaign for the presidency, and Buchanan would have given him a cabinet office if the appointment had been more popular in the South.  In January 1857, Buchanan's influence was not strong enough to win Forney a seat in the United States Senate, which went instead to Simon Cameron.  In August 1857, Forney established the Philadelphia Press, an independent Democratic newspaper.

At first a Douglas Democrat and a supporter of Buchanan, upon the adoption of the Lecompton Constitution in the latter days of the Buchanan administration, he declined to support the Buchanan administration's effort to secure the admission of Kansas on that basis, and joined the Republican Party. He contributed to the organization of the Republican Party and its early successes.  From 1859 to 1861, he was a second time clerk of the House, and he published in Washington, D.C. the Sunday Morning Chronicle, which in 1862 was changed to a daily, and was throughout the Civil War looked upon as the organ of the Lincoln administration.

In 1861, he became Secretary of the United States Senate. Among the events of his secretariat may be remembered that he was the first to read aloud, in a joint session of Congress, George Washington's Farewell Address, a reading that became traditional after 1888. 'In January 1862, with the Constitution endangered by civil war, a thousand citizens of Philadelphia petitioned Congress to commemorate the forthcoming 130th anniversary of George Washington’s birth by providing that “the Farewell Address of Washington be read aloud on the morning of that day in one or the other of the Houses of Congress.” Both houses agreed and assembled in the House of Representatives’ chamber
on February 22, 1862, where Secretary of the Senate John W. Forney “rendered ‘The Farewell Address’ very effectively,” as one observer recalled.'

On the death of Lincoln, Forney supported Andrew Johnson for a short time, but afterward became one of the foremost in the struggle which resulted in the president's impeachment. In 1868, no longer Secretary of the Senate, he disposed of his interest in the Chronicle and returned to Philadelphia where in 1871 he was made collector of the port by President Ulysses S. Grant.  He held the office for one year, and during that time perfected the system of direct transportation of imports in bond without appraisement and examination at the port of original entry.

He was an earnest promoter of the Centennial Exposition and visited Europe in its interest in 1875.  In 1877 he sold the Press and established a weekly, the Progress, which he edited until his death.  Progress continued to be published by the Forney Publishing Company after his death.   In 1880 he left the Republican Party and supported Winfield Scott Hancock for the presidency.  He is buried in West Laurel Hill Cemetery, Bala Cynwyd, Pennsylvania.

Forney's daughter Tillie achieved some renown as a journalist.

The town of Forney, Texas is named in his honor.

Authored
 Letters from Europe (1869)
 What I Saw in Texas (1872)
 Anecdotes of Public Men (two volumes, 1873)
 A Centennial Commissioner in Europe (Philadelphia, 1876)
 Forty Years of American Journalism (1877)
 Life & Military Career of Winfield Scott Hancock  (1880)
 The New Nobility (1881)

References

Sources
 McClure, Old Time Notes of Pennsylvania (1905)

 This source reports his middle name as Wien.

Attribution

External links

Senate biography
 Biography-West Laurel Hill Cemetery web site

Politicians from Philadelphia
19th-century American newspaper publishers (people)
American political writers
Politicians from Lancaster, Pennsylvania
1817 births
1881 deaths
Clerks of the United States House of Representatives
Secretaries of the United States Senate
Pennsylvania Democrats
Pennsylvania Republicans
19th-century American journalists
American male journalists
19th-century American male writers
Journalists from Pennsylvania
Writers from Lancaster, Pennsylvania